Sweet Home Mine is a mine near Alma, Colorado, United States. It was founded in 1873 as a silver mine. It is best known as the source of the famous rhodochrosite crystals "Alma King", displayed at the Denver Museum of Nature and Science, and "Alma Rose", displayed at the Rice Northwest Museum of Rocks and Minerals in Oregon.

See also
Orphan Boy mine

References

External links

 
A geochemical study of the Sweet Home Mine, Colorado Mineral Belt, USA: hydrothermal fluid evolution above a hypothesized granite cupola, from The Smithsonian/NASA Astrophysics Data System

Buildings and structures in Park County, Colorado
Silver mines in the United States
Mines in Colorado